The Palace of Justice of Aix-en-Provence (French: "Palais de justice d'Aix-en-Provence") is a listed historical building in Aix-en-Provence, Bouches-du-Rhône, France.

Location
The Palace of Justice is located on the Place de Verdun in the centre of Aix-en-Provence.

History
Architect Claude-Nicolas Ledoux was commissioned to build or rebuild The palace in 1787. Two hundred houses were demolished to make space for the new construction. However, construction was discontinued because of the French Revolution of 1789. It resumed in 1822, when architect Michel Penchaud took over. The building was finally completed in 1831.

The building is flanked by two sculptures Joseph-Marius Ramus: on the left, Jean-Étienne-Marie Portalis; on the right, Joseph Jérôme, Comte Siméon.

Heritage significance
It has been listed as a monument historique since 1979.

Gallery

References

Monuments historiques of Aix-en-Provence
Government buildings completed in 1831
Courthouses in France
Neoclassical architecture in France
19th-century architecture in France